Bogdan Petrovich Yakimov (born 4 October 1994) is a Russian professional ice hockey centre. He is currently playing under contract with HC Dynamo Moscow in the Kontinental Hockey League (KHL). His National Hockey League (NHL) rights are held by the Edmonton Oilers.  Yakimov was selected 32nd overall by HC Neftekhimik Nizhnekamsk in the 2011 KHL Junior Draft, and was also selected by the Edmonton Oilers in the 3rd round (83rd overall) of the 2013 NHL Entry Draft.

Playing career
Leading up to the 2013 NHL Entry Draft, Yakimov was lauded as a top prospect who was Ranked 11th in the NHL Central Scouting Bureau's Final 2013 International Skater Rankings. whilst playing with Reaktor of the MHL, a junior affiliate, of HC Nizhnekamsk Neftekhimik.

After his first season in the Kontinental Hockey League with Neftekhimik, Yakimov was signed to a three-year entry level contract with the Edmonton Oilers on 5 August 2014.

On 28 July 2016, Yakimov was loaned by the Oilers to return for a third stint with HC Neftekhimik Nizhnekamsk of the KHL for the 2016–17 season.
 
Continuing his loan into the 2017–18 season. He notched a career high 8 goals and matched his previous seasons 11 points in 56 games.

Unsigned from the Oilers, but his rights retained by the club, Yakimov opted to continue in the KHL with Nizhnekamsk. During the 2018–19 season, while stagnating with Nizhnekamsk in registering just 3 points in 27 games, Yakimov was traded to Avangard Omsk on 26 November 2018. His stay with Avangard was brief, after going scoreless in 5 games, he was again traded, joining his third KHL outfit, Severstal Cherepovets, on 23 December 2018.

On 1 May 2020, with one-year remaining under contract, Yakimov was traded by Severstal to perennial contending club, SKA Saint Petersburg, in exchange for financial compensation. Yakimov made 6 appearances with SKA before he was traded to HC Sochi in exchange for Daniil Ogirchuk and Pavel Kukshtel on 23 December 2020.

Career statistics

Regular season and playoffs

International

References

External links

1994 births
Living people
Avangard Omsk players
Bakersfield Condors players
HC Dynamo Moscow players
Edmonton Oilers draft picks
Edmonton Oilers players
HC Neftekhimik Nizhnekamsk players
Oklahoma City Barons players
People from Nizhnekamsk
Russian ice hockey centres
Russian expatriate ice hockey people
Russian expatriate sportspeople in Canada
Severstal Cherepovets players
SKA Saint Petersburg players
HC Sochi players
Competitors at the 2019 Winter Universiade
Universiade medalists in ice hockey
Universiade gold medalists for Russia
Sportspeople from Tatarstan